Notiphila riparia is a species of fly in the family Ephydridae. It is found in the  Palearctic .
jizz-Face often grey white, rarely yellow.
May–September, - Common on water edge vegetation(pools and streams). All Europe.Urals.Near East.

Distribution
Austria, Belgium, Czech Republic, Denmark, France, Hungary, Iran.

References

External links
Images representing Notiphila riparia at BOLD

Ephydridae
Insects described in 1830
Taxa named by Johann Wilhelm Meigen
Diptera of Europe
Diptera of Asia